Fuad Jorge Jury (28 May 1938 – 5 November 2012), better known by his stage name Leonardo Favio, was an Argentine singer, actor and filmmaker. He is considered one of Argentina's best film directors and one of the country's most enduring cultural figures, as well as a popular singer-songwriter throughout Latin America.

He also starred in many films before establishing himself as a director.

At the time he began his singing career (mid-1960s), Favio was already an established film director. His first feature movie – Chronicle of a Boy Alone – and the second one –  – are considered to be some of the best Argentine movies of all times. In 1976, he released the comedy-drama , with Gian Franco Pagliaro and Carlos Monzón, which had a mixed critical reception at the time of its release; it is currently considered a cult film. That same year, right after the beginning of the Argentina's last civil-military dictatorship (1976–1983), Favio was forced to go into exile to save his life from the State-sponsored terrorism which prevailed in the country. He returned to Argentina after democracy was reestablished during the 1980s onwards, later breaking a 17-year gap without filming when he released the successful biopic , before embarking in the making of his colossal six-hours' documentary . Favio's last film was Aniceto (2008), a musical remake of {{lang|es|El romance del Aniceto y la Francisca}, refashioned as a ballet-inspired drama.

Biography 
Favio was born Fuad Jorge Jury, the son of Syrian-Lebanese Jorge Jury Atrach. His brother is writer and director Jorge Zuhair Jury. Favio was married to actress María Vaner, with whom he had two children, one being the composer Nico Jury.

On 9 October 2010, Favio was appointed Argentina's Ambassador of Culture by national decree of president Cristina Fernández de Kirchner. He died on 5 November 2012 in Buenos Aires, at the age of 74.

Works

Discography 
 Me miró, LP
 Aquí está, LP
 Yo soy, LP
 De amor nadie muere, LP
 Una cita con Leonardo Favio, LP
 Leonardo Favio, LP
 Favio 73, LP
 Hola Che, LP
 Favio, LP in Spain
 Vamos a Puerto Rico, LP
 En Concierto, LP
 Era... cómo podría explicar, LP
 En Concierto, LP
 Leonardo Favio, LP (1969)
 Fuíste mía un verano, LP (1968)
 No jueges más, LP
 Más Que Un Loco, LP (1989)

Filmography

Director 
 Aniceto (2008)
 Perón, sinfonía del sentimiento (1999)
 Gatica, el mono (1993)
 Soñar, soñar (1976)
 Nazareno Cruz y el Lobo (1975)
 Juan Moreira (1973)
 El Dependiente (1969)
 Éste es el romance del Aniceto y la Francisca, de cómo quedó trunco, comenzó la tristeza y unas pocas cosas más.. (1966)
 Crónica de un niño solo (1965)
 El amigo (1960)
 El señor Fernández (1958; unfinished)

Actor 
 Tobi y el libro mágico (2000)
Campo de sangre (1999)
 Gatica, "El Mono" (1993)
Simplemente una rosa (1971)
 Fuiste mía un verano (1969)
 El dependiente (1969)
 Martín Fierro (1968)
 El ojo de tu madre (1966)
 Crónica de un niño solo (1965)
 Paula cautiva (1963)
 La terraza (1963)
 La Mano en la trampa (1961)
 Fin de fiesta (1960)
 En la ardiente oscuridad (1958)
 El ángel de España (1958)
 The Kidnapper (1958)
 El jefe (1958)
 El Ángel de España (1958; de extra)

As producer 
 Gatica "el Mono" (1993)
 Nazareno Cruz y el Lobo (1975)

References

External links 

 
 Leonardo Favio Web
 Favio's "Ave Maria" song Avemariasongs.org

1938 births
2012 deaths
People from Mendoza Province
Argentine male film actors
Argentine film directors
Argentine film producers
Argentine screenwriters
Male screenwriters
Argentine male writers
20th-century Argentine male singers
Argentine people of Syrian descent
Argentine people of Lebanese descent
Burials at La Chacarita Cemetery
20th-century Argentine male actors
21st-century Argentine male actors
Films directed by Leonardo Favio